Signet may refer to:
Signet, Kenya, A subsidiary of the Kenyan Broadcasting Corporation (KBC), specifically set up to broadcast and distribute the DTT signals
 Signet ring, a ring with a seal set into it, typically by leaving an impression in sealing wax
Signet ring cell, a malignant cell type associated with cancers
 Signet Books, a book-publishing imprint of the New American Library
 Signet Press, a publisher in India.
 SigneT, a class of racing dinghy, designed in 1961 by Ian Proctor
 Signet (Phi Sigma Kappa), a publication produced by the fraternity Phi Sigma Kappa published four times a year
 Signet Jewelers, the world's largest speciality retail jeweller
USS Signet (AM-302), a minesweeper
 Kodak Signet, Kodak 1950s 35mm still camera line
 Signet (automobile)

Places 
Signet, Ontario, a community in Canada
Signet, Oxfordshire, a hamlet in England

See also
 Society of Writers to Her Majesty's Signet, a legal society of solicitors in Scotland
 Cygnet (disambiguation)